The women's 100 metre butterfly competition of the swimming events at the 2011 World Aquatics Championships took place on 24 and 25 July. The heats and semifinals took place on 24 July and the final was held on 25 July.

Records
Prior to the competition, the existing world and championship records were as follows.

Results

Heats

47 swimmers participated in 6 heats, qualified swimmers are listed:

Reserve place swimoff
As two swimmers had the same time in the heats at place 17 they had to participate in a swimoff to determine the first semifinal reserve swimmer.

Semifinals
The semifinals were held on 24 July at 18:00.

Semifinal 1

Semifinal 2

Final
The final was held at 18:02.

References

External links
2011 World Aquatics Championships: Women's 100 metre butterfly entry list, from OmegaTiming.com; retrieved 2011-07-23.

Butterfly 100 metre, women's
World Aquatics Championships
2011 in women's swimming